John Stirling (1776–1846) was a minister of the Church of Scotland who served as Moderator of the General Assembly in 1833, the highest position in the Scottish church.

Life

He was born in Dunblane in 1776 the second son of John Stirling. He studied Divinity at Glasgow University and was licensed to preach by the Presbytery of Dunblane in January 1800.

In November 1805 under patronage of William Campbell, Laird of Craigie he was ordained as minister of Craigie, South Ayrshire. In May 1812 Glasgow University awarded him an honorary Doctor of Divinity.

In 1833 he succeeded the controversial Rev Thomas Chalmers as Moderator of the General Assembly of the Church of Scotland the highest position in the Scottish Church. He was succeeded in turn by Rev Patrick MacFarlan.

He died in Craigie manse on 13 January 1846 and is buried in Craigie Cemetery.

Family

In April 1806 he married Mary McQuhae daughter of Rev Dr William McQuhae of St Quivox. They had several children:

James Stirling (1807-1823) born 7.5 months after the marriage
Mary Laurie Stirling (1808-1867) married Thomas Ainsworth of The Flosh, High Sheriff of Cumberland
Isobella (1809-1826)
Jane Erskine Stirling (b.1811)
Elizabeth (1812-1840) married William Erskine of the Bombay Medical Service
Lydia Ainsworth Stirling (1814-1829)
William (1816-1852) became a Liverpool merchant
Rose Sophia (b,1818)
John Stirling of Fairburn (1820-1907) a flax spinner in Cleator 
Laura Margaret (1822-1846)
Annabella Fullerton (b.1824)
James (1827-1846)

References
 

1776 births
1846 deaths
People from Dunblane
Moderators of the General Assembly of the Church of Scotland